Flavius Felix (died 430), sometimes erroneously called Constantius Felix, was a general of the Western Roman Empire, who reached the prominent rank of patrician before being killed probably by order of Aetius. For his consulate, in 428, he issued some consular diptychs, one of which has been preserved until modern times.

Felix served during the reign of emperors Valentinian III and Theodosius II. Between 425 (year in which he was made patricius) and 429 he served as magister utriusque militae in defense of Italy, but despite a brief mention of one of his military actions in the Notitia Dignitatum, his subordinates Bonifacius and Aetius were considered more significant in this regard. In 426 he ordered the death of Patroclus, bishop of Arelate, and of Titus, deacon in Rome. The following year he opposed Bonifacius' rebellion in Northern Africa sending some troops to this province. This force was defeated by the troops loyal to Bonifacius.

In 428 he was elected consul for the West. In May 430, Felix, his wife Padusia and a deacon named Grunnitus were murdered in Basilica Ursiana in Ravenna for reasons that are not clear. Priscus suggests Felix was accused of plotting against Aetius with the emperor's mother Galla Placidia and was killed by order of Aetius himself.

His carved ivory consular diptych is notable for depicting his clothing in great detail. The diptych survived intact until the French Revolution, when the right leaf was stolen; it is now believed lost.

According to a recent reconstruction of his familial bonds, he was an ancestor of Arcadius Placidus Magnus Felix, consul in 511, and a son of Ennodius. Born about 380 he might have been the man who was the husband of a daughter (born 385) of Agricola, consul in 421 and perhaps the father of Emperor Avitus, being the parents of Magnus, consul in 460 and Felix Ennodius, proconsul in Africa in about 420 or 423.

References

Bibliography 
 
 

430 deaths
5th-century Romans
5th-century Roman consuls
Imperial Roman consuls
Magistri militum
Year of birth unknown
Ancient Roman murder victims